The Chania Plain is a relatively level landform spreading southward from the city of Chania on the island of Crete in the present day country of Greece. The Chania Plain has been used as a logical study area for air pollution transport in the vicinity of Chania.  In ancient times the city of Kydonia, the site of present-day Chania, controlled an expansive area which included the Chania Plain lying to its south at least to Malaxa Mountain.

See also
 Kastelli Hill
 Polichne
 Malaxa

Line notes

References
 George Karvounis et al. (2007) On the Sensitivity of AERMOD to Surface Parameters under Various Anemological Conditions
 C. Michael Hogan, Cydonia, The Modern Antiquarian, Jan. 23, 2008

Plains of Greece
Landforms of Crete
Landforms of Chania (regional unit)